The Telkom Knockout is a football (soccer) knockout competition which comprises the 16 teams in the South African Premier Soccer League.

In all matches there has to be a winner on the day, this will be decided if there is a winner after full-time (90 minutes). If teams are tied at full-time then extra time will be played, penalties will decide the winner if the scores are still even (there is no golden goal rule).

Teams
The 16 teams that competed in the Telkom Knockout competition are: (listed in alphabetical order).

 Ajax Cape Town
 AmaZulu
 Bay United
 Bidvest Wits
 Bloemfontein Celtic
 Free State Stars
 Lamontville Golden Arrows
 Kaizer Chiefs
 Mamelodi Sundowns
 Maritzburg United
 Moroka Swallows
 Orlando Pirates
 Platinum Stars
 Santos
 SuperSport United
 Thanda Royal Zulu

Prize money

The Telkom Knockout is the highest paying cup competition in Africa with a grand total prize money of R 14 200 000.00.
 Each team taking part in the Telkom Knockout will receive a Participation Fee of R 250 000.00

First Round Losers

 Prize Money: R 200 000.00
 Participation Fee: R 250 000.00
Total: R 450 000.00 for 8 teams each

Losing Quarterfinalists

 Prize Money: R 400 000.00
 Participation Fee: R 250 000.00
Total: R 650 000.00 for 4 teams each

Losing Semi-Finalists

 Prize Money: R 750 000.00
 Participation Fee: R 250 000.00
Total: R 1 000 000.00 for 2 teams each

Final – Runner-up

 Prize Money: R 1 500 000.00
 Participation Fee: R 250 000.00
Total: R 1 750 000.00

Final – Winner

 Prize Money: R 4 000 000.00
 Participation Fee: R 250 000.00
Total: R 4 250 000.00

Total prize money

 Total Prize Money: R 10 200 000.00
 Total Participation Fee: R 4 000 000.00
Grand Total: R 14 200 000.00

Results

First round

Quarter-finals

 The draw was done on Monday 27 October 2008.

Semi-finals

 The draw was done on Monday 10 November 2008.

Final

Tournament Table

Top scorers

References
Telkom Knockout
SAFA

External links
Telkom Knockout Cup Official Website
Telkom Official Website
Premier Soccer League
South African Football Association
Confederation of African Football

Telkom Knockout
Telkom Knockout, 2008
Telkom Knockout